Black Brook is an  stream located in southern New Hampshire in the United States.  It is a tributary of the Merrimack River, which flows to the Gulf of Maine.

Black Brook begins at the outlet of Kimball Pond in Dunbarton, New Hampshire.  The brook travels southeast into Goffstown and then Manchester, joining the Merrimack just upstream from Amoskeag Falls.

See also

List of rivers of New Hampshire

References

Rivers of New Hampshire
Tributaries of the Merrimack River
Rivers of Merrimack County, New Hampshire
Rivers of Hillsborough County, New Hampshire